Michael Conrad (October 16, 1925November 22, 1983) was an American actor perhaps best known for his portrayal of veteran cop Sgt. Phil Esterhaus on Hill Street Blues, in which he ended the introductory roll call to each week's show with "Let's be careful out there". He won two Emmy Awards for Outstanding Supporting Actor in a Drama Series for Hill Street Blues in 1981 and 1982.

Life and career
Conrad served in the United States Army during World War II.

Conrad had a long acting career in television from the 1950s to the 1980s. In 1962 he appeared in the television series Car 54, Where Are You? in an uncredited part as a construction worker. He played Felton Grimes, the title character and murder victim, in the 1963 Perry Mason episode "The Case of the Bigamous Spouse", and in 1965 played the role of a villain named AC in My Favorite Martian, "Martin's Revoltin' Development", and played the role of Paul in The FBI (season 1, episode 24), "The Man Who Went Mad by Mistake".

In 1972, Conrad played Michael Stivic's conventional Polish-American Uncle Casimir on two episodes of All in the Family. The same year, he appeared, together with Richard Crenna and Alain Delon, in the French-language film Un flic, directed by Jean-Pierre Melville. He also had a memorable role in the 1974 film The Longest Yard, playing Nate Scarboro, a retired NFL tight end (New York Giants) who was also the head coach for "the Mean Machine", the team of prisoners put together by Burt Reynolds' character Paul Crewe to play the team of guards.
During the 1976–77 season of Delvecchio, Conrad was a regular as Lt. Macavan.

Conrad is perhaps best known for his role as Sgt. Philip Freemason Esterhaus on the 1981-1987 police drama Hill Street Blues, a role he played for 71 episodes, always uttering his famous end of police roll call with the expression “let’s be careful out there”, until his death.

Death
Conrad died from urethral cancer in November 1983 during the fourth season of Hill Street Blues. The show's writers wrote his death into the show, although they credited the character's death to a different reason.

Spouses
 Denise McCluggage (1953–54; divorced)
 Emilie Demille (October 30, 1963 - February 1967; divorced)
 Sima Goldberg (January 27, 1974 - November 22, 1983; his death)

Television and filmography

 Demetrius and the Gladiators (1954) as Gladiator (uncredited)
 Harbormaster (1957, TV Series) 
 The Mugger (1958) as Guy Throwing Craps
 Requiem for a Heavyweight (1962) as Ma Greeny's Thug
 The Naked City (1959, TV Series) as Hartog (episode "Fire Island")
  The Edge of Night (1959–60, TV Series) as "Big" Frank Dubeck
 Car 54, Where Are You? (1962, TV Series) as Construction Foreman / Smasher (uncredited)
 Route 66 (1960-1963, TV Series) as Deputy Sam Harris / Al Jenkins
 Perry Mason (1963, TV Series) as Felton Grimes
 Wagon Train (1963, TV Series) as Luke Moss
 The Twilight Zone (TV Series, episode "Black Leather Jackets") as Deputy Sheriff Harper
 Brenner (1959-1964, TV Series) as Chick Arnel
 Flipper (1964, TV Series) as Conlon
 Rawhide (1965, TV Series) as Jerry Munson
 Daniel Boone (1965, TV Series) as Sharben
 The War Lord (1965) as Rainault
 The Dick Van Dyke Show (1965, TV Series) as Bernie Stern / Mr. Mack
 Gomer Pyle, U.S.M.C. (1966, TV Series) as Sergeant Arthur Henchley
 My Favorite Martian (1966, TV Series) as A.C.
 Laredo (1966, TV Series) as Willie G. Tinney
 Bonanza (1966, TV Series) as Hank Kelly
 I Spy (1965-1966, TV Series) as Dinat / Morton
 Gunsmoke (1964-1966, TV Series) as Cash McLean / Paul Douglas / Dick Corwin
 That Girl (1966, TV Series) as Mr. Johnson
 The Fugitive (1966, TV Series) as Hogan
 Felony Squad (1966-1967, TV Series) as Zackary / Steve
 Blackbeard's Ghost (1968) as Pinetop Purvis
 Lost in Space (1968, TV Series) as Creech
 Sol Madrid (1968) as Scarpi
 Three Guns for Texas (1968) as Ranger Willy G. Tinney
 It Takes a Thief (1968, TV Series) as Anton
 Castle Keep (1969) as Sgt. DeVaca
 They Shoot Horses, Don't They? (1969) as Rollo
 The Virginian (1969-1970, TV Series) as John White / Sam Marish
 Monte Walsh (1970) as Dally Johnson
 The Silent Force (episode "Cry in Concrete") (1970, TV Series) as Max Fredericks
 Head On (1971) as Mike
 The Todd Killings (1971) as Detective Shaw
 Ironside (1970-1971, TV Series) as Tracy / Frank O'Neill
 Thumb Tripping (1972) as Diesel
 Mission: Impossible (1970, TV Series) as Ralph Davies
 Alias Smith and Jones (1972, TV Series) as Mike McCloskey
 Un Flic (1972) as Louis Costa
 All in the Family (1972, TV Series) as Uncle Casimir Stivic
 Scream Blacula Scream (1973) as Sheriff Harley Dunlop
 Love, American Style (1973, TV Series) as Rossi (segment "Love and the See-Through Mind")
 Mannix (1970-1973, TV Series) as Dave Tremble / Rick
 The F.B.I. (1966-1973, TV Series) as Roger Tetlow / Paul Hogan
 The Bob Newhart Show (1973-1974, TV Series) as Mr. Trevesco
 W (1974) as Lt. Whitfield
 The Longest Yard (1974) as Nate Scarboro
 Lucas Tanner (1974, TV Series) as Mr. Farnsworth
 Planet of the Apes (1974, TV Series) as Janor
 Satan's Triangle (1975, TV Movie) as Lt. Cmdr. Pagnolini
 Emergency! (1973-1975, TV Series) - Bob Stecker / Bob Hurley
 S.W.A.T. (1975, TV Series) as Vince
 Gone with the West (1975) as Smithy
 The Rockford Files (1975, TV Series) as George Macklan
 Baby Blue Marine (1976) as Drill Instructor
 Harry and Walter Go to New York (1976) as Billy Gallagher
 Starsky and Hutch (1975-1976, TV Series) as Capt. Mike Ferguson / Cannell
 The Six Million Dollar Man (1975-1977, TV Series) as Boris Retsky / Jimbo
 Little House on the Prairie (1977, TV Series) as Broder
 Hawaii Five-O (1972-1978, TV Series) as Arthur / Kira Johnson
 How the West Was Won (1978, TV Series) as Marshal Russell
 Charlie's Angels (1978, TV Series) as Ed Slocum
 The Waltons (1978, TV Series) as Matt Sarver
 Soap (1978, TV Series) as 'Boomer' David
 Vega$ (1979, TV Series) as Albert Brown
 Barney Miller (1979, TV Series) as Col. Charles Dundee
 CHiPs (1979, TV Series) as Mr. Chambers / Karl Maddox
 Las mujeres de Jeremías (1980) as Spencer
 Cattle Annie and Little Britches (1981) as Engineer
 The Incredible Hulk (1981, TV Series) as Emerson Fletcher
 Hill Street Blues (1981-1984, TV Series) (65 episodes) as Sgt. Phil Esterhaus (final appearance)

References

External links
 
 
 
 Michael Conrad at the University of Wisconsin's Actors Studio audio collection

1925 births
1983 deaths
Male actors from New York City
American male television actors
Outstanding Performance by a Supporting Actor in a Drama Series Primetime Emmy Award winners
Deaths from cancer in California
20th-century American male actors